The 1988 Washington Huskies football team was an American football team that represented the University of Washington during the 1988 NCAA Division I-A football season.  In its fourteenth season under head coach Don James, the team compiled a 6–5 record (3–5 in the Pacific-10 Conference, tied for sixth), and outscored its opponents 254 to 223. The five losses were by a combined margin of fifteen points. Washington did not play in a bowl game for the first time in ten seasons.

Aaron Jenkins was selected as the team's most valuable player. Jenkins, Ricky Andrews, Darryl Hall, and Mike Zandofsky were the team captains.

Schedule

Personnel

Season summary

Washington State

NFL Draft
Five Huskies were selected in the 1989 NFL Draft.

References

Washington
Washington Huskies football seasons
Washington Huskies football